Transport for Wales Rail Limited, branded as Transport for Wales and TfW Rail ( and ), is a Welsh publicly owned train operating company, a subsidiary of Transport for Wales (TfW), a Welsh Government-owned company. It commenced operations of the day to day services of the Wales & Borders franchise on 7 February 2021, as an operator of last resort, succeeding KeolisAmey Wales. Transport for Wales Rail manages 248 National Rail stations, including all 223 in Wales, and operates all passenger mainline services wholly within Wales, and services from Wales, Chester, and Shrewsbury to Liverpool, Manchester, Manchester Airport, Crewe, Birmingham, Bidston and Cheltenham.

History
In May 2018, the Wales & Borders franchise was awarded by Transport for Wales to KeolisAmey Wales. Scheduled to run for 15 years, it commenced in October 2018.

Following a collapse in revenues, and a significant reduction in passenger numbers as a result of the COVID-19 pandemic, the original franchise had become financially unviable. On 7 February 2021, Transport for Wales Rail Limited, the Welsh Government's operator of last resort, succeeded KeolisAmey Wales as operator of the Wales & Borders franchise. KeolisAmey and Transport for Wales will continue a partnership on further improvements on the network, with Amey Infrastructure Wales (AIW) continuing to have an involvement in the delivering of some key projects such as the Core Valley Lines.

Services
, Transport for Wales Rail operates these regular and daily services Monday to Friday:

Rolling stock

Transport for Wales Rail inherited from KeolisAmey Wales a fleet of Class 143, 150, 153, 158, 170 and 175 diesel multiple units, Class 230 diesel-battery-electric multiple units, Class 769 bi-mode multiple units and Mark 4 and DVT sets with an allocation of Class 67 locomotives.

Class 143 Pacers, which were not compliant with persons with reduced mobility legislation  (PRM), were withdrawn on 29 May 2021 when their PRM dispensation ended.

Class 197 and 231 diesel multiple units, Class 756 tri-mode multiple units and Class 398 tram-trains will replace the Class 150, 153, 158, 175 and 769 units by 2023.

Future fleet
All of Transport for Wales Rail's KeolisAmey Wales-inherited and extra temporary fleet is due to be replaced by 2023 (with the exception of the Class 67 locomotives).

Cascades and refurbishments

Class 67-hauled Mark 4 set
Six Class 67 locomotives have been adapted to work with three sets each comprising four Mark 4 carriages and a Mark 4 Driving Van Trailer, which will replace the Mark 3 stock previously used on locomotive-hauled services. The twelve carriages and three DVTs were able to cascade from London North Eastern Railway, as a result of the introduction of Class 800s and Class 801s on the East Coast Main Line. The Mark 4 coaches have retained the Virgin Trains East Coast livery, but with Transport for Wales labels attached. The Mark 4 Driving Van Trailers will be repainted into the new Transport for Wales livery. Four of the six Class 67 locomotives have been repainted into TfW Rail livery. TfW Rail introduced the Mark 4 sets in June 2021 on Cardiff to Holyhead services, and from December 2022 they will operate services between Swansea and Manchester using trains which had previously been planned to be used on the Blackpool route by Grand Central. The three Mark 4 sets will be retained and will remain on the routes they will work from their date of introduction on TfW Rail services.

Class 153

TfW Rail will retain eight Class 153 units to operate services on the Heart of Wales line.

Class 170
All 12 Class 170 units are to be transferred to East Midlands Railway. All of TfW Rail's two-car units have already moved to East Midlands Railway with the three-car units to follow in Spring 2023.

New trains
For the longer term fleet replacement, 148 brand new trains will be introduced including 77 CAF Civity trains (Class 197), 35 FLIRT trains (Class 231 & Class 756) and 36 Citylink tram-trains (Class 398) have been ordered. The addition of these trains to the fleet, from 2021 to 2024 but mostly in 2022–23, will allow the 109 (total) Class 150, 153 (13 by then), 158, 175 and 769 units to be withdrawn.

Class 197 Civity
A total of 77 Class 197 Civity diesel multiple units have been ordered from CAF for long-distance routes. These trains will have end gangways, but fewer toilets than the Class 158 and Class 175 DMUs they replace. They will however be quicker, with more powerful engines and more efficient transmissions for better acceleration, as well as a higher top speed than the Class 158. Fifty one Class 197 units would be two-cars and 26 would be three-cars.

CAF will undertake fabrication, welding and painting of the Class 197 fleet in their factory in Beasain, Spain. The first Driving Motor carriage vehicle bodyshell had largely passed this stage by 12 February 2020, when it was pictured in the Beasain factory. The painted bodyshells will then be shipped to Newport, South Wales, for further assembly/component-fitment at CAF's new UK factory in Llanwern.

Class 230 D-Train

Five  D-Train diesel- and battery-electric multiple units were expected to enter service from May 2022. These are being built in England from former London Underground D78 Stock aluminium bodyshells by start-up rolling stock manufacturer Vivarail between 2019 and 2020. The units began driver training in late August and is yet to be confirmed of entering service. Five Class 230 units will be retained and will remain on the routes they will work from their date of introduction on TfW Rail services.

Class 756/231 FLIRT and Class 398 Citylink
Also, a total of 35 Stadler FLIRT units have been ordered (consisting of 24 Class 756 tri-modes - 7 three-car & 17 four-car units - and 11 Class 231 diesel-electrics), along with 36 Class 398 Stadler Citylink tram-trains. These will be manufactured at the Stadler factory in Szolnok, Hungary and assembled at their plant in Bussnang, Switzerland.

Future fleet summary

Past fleet 
Between September 2021 and November 2022, all of the two-car Class 170s transferred to East Midlands Railway.

Notes

References

External links

Government-owned companies of Wales
Operators of last resort
Railway companies established in 2021
Railway companies of Wales
Transport operators of Wales
2021 establishments in Wales